Roger Eatwell is a British academic currently an Emeritus Professor of Politics at the University of Bath.

Since the late 1970s, Eatwell has engaged in research in fascism and populism. He defines fascism as a syncretic ideology, which could attract both the masses and intellectuals in some countries, and lead elites to think they could use radical fascism. It centered on three tropes: the need to create a holistic nation which transcended divisions; to forge a New Man elite and people fervently committed to this nation, and to build an authoritarian third way state (neither communist nor capitalist). Eatwell has sought to distinguish fascism from both historic and contemporary populism, which he sees as based on a very different three tropes: the need to respond to the popular will; a defence of the plain people (similar to the German Volk); and a critique of self-serving liberal economic and political elites.

In his most recent book on national populism, considerable emphasis is placed on four long run factors which are termed the "4Ds": growing distrust of political elites in liberal democracies; growing fears about the destruction of national and local communities; growing concerns about relative deprivation and fears for the future; and growing dealignment from mainstream parties. Although Eatwell's work on contemporary politics mainly focuses on parties which (unlike historic fascism) eschew violence, he has also written about the potential for "cumulative extremism", namely where one form of violence sparks off another in a dangerous spiral—a train likely to grow if the current populist wave fades, leaving many even angrier.

Series editorships 
 
  At the time of standing down as the co-editor of the series on the 20th anniversary of its founding, 65 books had appeared or were under contract.

Selected bibliography 
Books:
 
 
 
 
 
 
 
 
  A 2018 Sunday Times book of the year.
Other Works:

See also 
 Matthew Goodwin
 Cas Mudde

References

External links 
 Profile Page: Roger Eatwell Google Scholar
 Author Page: Roger Eatwell Amazon

Academics and writers on far-right extremism
Populism scholars
Living people
Year of birth missing (living people)
Academics of the University of Bath